Liu Xian may refer to:

 Liu Xian (Prince of Wu) (劉賢), Western Han Dynasty prince, son of Liu Pi (劉濞).
 Liu Xian (Prince of Zichuan) (劉賢; died 154), Western Han Dynasty prince, son of Liu Fei (劉肥).
 Liu Xian (Prince of Jiaodong) (劉賢), Western Han Dynasty prince, son of Liu Ji (劉寄).
 Liu Xian (Prince of Chen) (劉羨; died 97), Eastern Han Dynasty prince, son of Emperor Ming.
 Liu Xian (Prince of Donghai) (劉羨), Eastern Han Dynasty prince.
 Liu Xian (Later Zhao) (劉顯); Later Zhao military general and emperor during the Sixteen Kingdoms period.
 Liu Xian (劉賢), a fictional character in the historical novel Romance of the Three Kingdoms. See List of fictional people of the Three Kingdoms#Chapter 52.